This is a list of countries by southernmost point on land. Where borders are contested, the southernmost point under the control of a nation is listed, excluding points within Antarctica and its outlying islands south of 60°S.

Notes

Southernmost point
Geography-related lists